Ron Jenkins (born 1952) is an American former sprinter.

References

1952 births
Living people
American male sprinters
Place of birth missing (living people)
Universiade medalists in athletics (track and field)
Universiade gold medalists for the United States
Medalists at the 1973 Summer Universiade
Date of birth missing (living people)